State Highway 123 is a north–south state highway that extends from Interstate 35 in San Marcos to US 181 in Karnes City.  The route was initially proposed in 1927 and has had minimal changes to its routing since then.

Route description
SH 123 begins at an intersection with US Route 181 just south of Karnes City and proceeds northward along the town's eastern edge.  The route intersects the Business Route of US 181 and Texas State Highway 80 as it passes through town.  The road continues north through farmlands before reaching an intersection with US Route 87 in Stockdale.  The route continues north through ranchlands until Seguin.  Reaching Seguin, Texas State Highway 46 begins, peeling off to the northwest toward New Braunfels. SH 123 continues around the eastern edge of Seguin, where it is known locally as "the Bypass", and there it intersects US 90 Alternate, US 90, and Interstate 10.  The highway continues north, reaching its northern terminus at Interstate 35 in San Marcos.

The route has two business segments: Business 123-B, largely on Austin St, through historic downtown Seguin, and Business 123-D in Karnes City.

Route history
The route was initially proposed on April 12, 1927 from Stockdale to San Marcos with a proposed extension south to Karnes City. On September 21, 1931, it was rerouted to end in Floresville. On August 4, 1932, it was restored to Karnes City, and the old route was renumbered as SH 168. On November 6, 1934, it was rerouted to Yorktown. On February 16, 1935, its south end was changed back to Karnes City. On November 18, 1938, SH 123 Loop was designated in Karnes City. On September 26, 1939, SH 123 Loop was renumbered as Loop 17. Paving was completed in the mid-1940s.

Major intersections

References

123
Transportation in Karnes County, Texas
Transportation in Wilson County, Texas
Transportation in Guadalupe County, Texas
Transportation in Hays County, Texas